Anthony Bentley (born 20 December 1939) is an English footballer who played in the Football League for Stoke City and Southend United.

Career
Bentley was born in Trent Vale, Stoke-on-Trent, and began his career with local side Stoke City making his senior debut in the 1958–59 season. He played as a forward in 1959–60 scoring nine goals in 13 matches. Under new manager Tony Waddington in 1960–61 he scored six goals in 35 matches but Waddington was seemingly unimpressed by Bentley and he was sold to Third Division side Southend United in July 1961.

The "Shrimpers" manager Ted Fenton converted Bentley into a full-back and he became a consistent performer for the Roots Hall side in the 1960s playing ten seasons for the club racking up 419 appearances. He was given a testimonial match against his old club Stoke in 1966. After his time at Southend he played non-League football with Folkestone Town and Ashford Town (Kent), with whom he made 34 league appearances during season 1974–75, before emigrating to Canada.

Career statistics
Source:

References

External links
 

1939 births
Living people
Footballers from Stoke-on-Trent
English footballers
Association football fullbacks
Stoke City F.C. players
Southend United F.C. players
Ashford United F.C. players
Folkestone F.C. players
English Football League players